Henry Eyster Jacobs (November 10, 1844 – July 7, 1932) was an American religious educator, Biblical commentator and Lutheran theologian.

Biography
Jacobs was born in Gettysburg, Pennsylvania, the son of professor Michael and Juliana M (Eyster) Jacobs. His sister Julia Jacobs Harpster became a missionary in India; his brother Michael William Jacobs became a judge. He graduated from Pennsylvania College in 1862 and from the Lutheran Theological Seminary at Gettysburg in 1865. Between 1870 and 1883, he was professor at Pennsylvania College. He was then appointed professor of systematic theology in The Lutheran Theological Seminary in Mount Airy, where he also assumed the office of dean in 1894. In 1920, he became President of the Seminary when the office of dean was abolished.

He served as president of his church's board of foreign missions (1902–07), of the General Council of Lutherans (1899, 1902, 1904), of the American Society of Church History (1907–08), and of the Pennsylvania German Society (1910–11). He also translated various German theological works and editing the Lutheran Church Review (1882–96), and Lutheran Commentary (1895-98). Henry Eyster Jacobs, working with John A.W. Haas, published The Lutheran Cyclopedia in 1899.

Lutheran Archives Center in Philadelphia holds a large collections of materials relating to Lutheran clergy, theologians and church workers including personal papers of Henry Eyster Jacobs.

Selected works
 First Free Lutheran Diet in America, Philadelphia, December 27–28, 1877  (1878) 
 The Lutheran movement in England during the reigns of Henry VIII and Edward VI, and its literary monuments  (1890)
The Lutheran Movement in England (1891)  
History of the Lutheran Church in America (1893)  
Elements of Religion (1894)  
Annotations on the Epistles of Paul to the Romans and I. Corinthians  (1896)
Annotations on the Epistles of Paul to I. Cortinthians VII-XVI, II. Corinthians and Galatians (1897)
Martin Luther, the hero of the reformation  (1898)
 The German Emigration to America, 1709- 40 (1899)  
 Summary of the Christian Faith  (1905)

References

Other sources
Wolf, Edmund Jacob. The Lutherans in America; a story of struggle, progress, influence and marvelous growth (J. A. Hill & Company, New York: 1890)

External links
 
 
 The Philadelphia Seminary biographical record, 1864-1923.
 The Church and the Ministry

American theologians
American Lutherans
American non-fiction writers
American translators
People from Gettysburg, Pennsylvania
American Lutheran hymnwriters
1844 births
1932 deaths
German–English translators
Seminary presidents
Gettysburg College alumni
Heads of universities and colleges in the United States